Christmas with The Smithereens is the eighth studio album by The Smithereens, released 9 October 2007 by Koch Records. The album features the band covering nine Christmas-themed songs along with three originals.

Critical reception 

AllMusic's Mark Deming rated the album 3½ stars out of 5 and said that "as rock & roll Christmas albums go, this is good fun and admirably eclectic." He added that the album "is more thoughtful and intriguing than the average tossed-together holiday offering, and the best moments are a clear reminder of what makes this band worthwhile."

Mike Rea of Contactmusic.com also rated the album 3½ stars out of 5, saying that it sounded like "an entirely Smithereens album", with the songs sounding like originals, "a hark back to the days when bands would make and release Christmas albums and songs without any trace of irony". He felt that the three Smithereens' originals "fit in perfectly".
 
Zach Freeman of the Blogger News Network gave the album a B+, stating: "Christmas with The Smithereens is more than a Christmas-time cover album. This quartet does an impressive job of channeling the spirt [sic] of 1960s rock, and solidly interpreting each memorable tune." Freeman added that the band's originals "add a nice twist to an otherwise familiar record, and are written with such '60s-savviness that without prior knowledge it would almost be difficult to decide which songs were covers and which were originals."

Track listing

Personnel 
Credits adapted from the album's liner notes.

The Smithereens
Pat DiNizio – vocals, guitar, harmonica, production
Jim Babjak – guitar, vocals (lead vocal on "Christmas"), bass on "Christmas Time Is Here Again", production  
Dennis Diken – drums, percussion, vocals (lead vocal on "Merry Christmas, Baby", "'Twas the Night Before Christmas" and "Christmas (I Remember)"), production  
Severo "The Thrilla" Jornacion – bass
Additional personnel
Kurt Reil – additional guitar, vocals, percussion, production, recording, mixing
Dave Amels – piano, chimes, Marxophone, electric piano, organ
Chris Bolger – bass, baritone guitar, acoustic guitar on "Christmas (I Remember)"
David Marks – guitar on "Christmas (I Remember)"
Joe Lambert – mastering
Paul Grosso – creative direction
Andrew Kelley – art direction, package design
Frankie Galasso – CD cover illustration, caricature art

References 

2007 Christmas albums
Rock Christmas albums
The Smithereens albums